Saint John Paul II Catholic School (commonly abbreviated to JPII) is a Catholic private school for grades Pre-K through 8th grade in western Houston, Texas. The school is within the Roman Catholic Archdiocese of Galveston-Houston. As of 2008 it serves over 700 students.

History

Opening

St. John Paul II Catholic School was established in 1988 as a private independent Catholic School and is fully accredited with the Texas Education Agency through the Texas Catholic Conference Accreditation Commission. The school is a registered, non-profit corporation in the state of Texas with a corporate Board of Directors. John Paul II opened with 56 students in Pre-Kindergarten through third grade in the fall of 1988 having temporary trailer buildings as classrooms/offices.

National Blue Ribbon School Awards
During the 1996–97 school year, and again in 2008 and 2018, St. John Paul II was named a National Blue Ribbon Exemplary School by the U.S. Department of Education. In 2008, the school was one of only fifty private schools to be so honored nationally. Poised for future growth, John Paul II moves forward as a unique Catholic school. Its graduates are currently enrolled in many of the private high schools in the area including Duchesne Academy, Pope John XXIII, St. Agnes Academy, St. Thomas High School, Strake Jesuit, St Pius X, and Incarnate Word Academy.

Expansion
As the student population has grown, new programs, facilities and staff have been added. A new $1.2 million-dollar classroom building was opened in the fall of 1994. Additional classrooms and a gym/cafeteria were opened in the fall of 1998. In January 2005, new construction added more classrooms, three computer labs, a library, a band hall, and two classrooms dedicated to fine arts. Early in 2011, construction began on campus in order to expand the school adding a new office workspace, separate cafeteria, theater stage, theater arts/music classrooms, art room, and a chapel. A mosaic of St. John Paul II was made for the school. The date to place the finished artwork was in July. It was put near the entrance of the chapel. Building was completed at the beginning of the 2011–2012 school year.

See also
 Christianity in Houston

References

External links
 Official School Page

Catholic elementary schools in Houston
Educational institutions established in 1988
Private K–8 schools in Houston
Catholic K–8 schools in the United States
1988 establishments in Texas